Alterian is a campaign management and real-time marketing software company headquartered in Denver, CO with offices in Bristol, UK and Sydney, Australia. Alterian was founded by Mike Talbot, David Eldridge and Tim McCarthy in 1997. Initially based in Weston-Super-Mare, UK, it moved its headquarters to Bristol.

Timeline
Alterian floated on the techMARK index of the London Stock Exchange in 2000

In May 2006, Alterian acquired email marketing software vendor Dynamics Direct

In July 2008, Alterian acquired Mediasurface, a UK based Web Content Management software vendor for $35.6 million

In July 2011, Alterian appointed Heath Davies as CEO, replacing David Eldridge who stepped down from the board in April 2011, along with the other founders Tim McCarthy and Mike Talbot later the same year.

In December 2011, Alterian was acquired by SDL International, a company best known for its language services and technology and its Web Content Management solution SDL Tridion.

In November 2016, Alterian divested from SDL and was acquired by Alterian Technology Holdings LLC, a privately owned company based in the US. It is currently led by Bob Hale, CEO.

References

External links

Pineparks Software Development company
Ambitas Software Solutions

Software companies of the United Kingdom
Companies established in 1997